KRKW may refer to:

 KRKW-LP, a low-power radio station (107.3 FM) licensed to serve Waimea, Hawaii, United States
 Rockwood Municipal Airport (ICAO code KRKW)